Russell Eugene Nixon (February 19, 1935 – November 8, 2016) was an American professional baseball player, coach and manager. He played as a catcher in Major League Baseball from 1957 to 1969. A veteran of 55 years in professional baseball, Nixon managed at virtually every level of the sport, from the lowest minor league to MLB assignments with the Cincinnati Reds and Atlanta Braves.

American League catcher
Nixon was born in Cleves, Ohio, near Cincinnati. He graduated from Western Hills High School in Cincinnati, and also attended the University of Cincinnati.

Nixon and his twin brother, Roy, an infielder, each signed with the Cleveland Indians in 1953. Although Roy never played Major League Baseball, retiring after five minor league seasons, Russ Nixon fashioned a 12-year MLB career with the Indians (1957–60), Boston Red Sox (1960–65; 1968) and Minnesota Twins (1966–67). In his best season, Nixon caught 101 games for Cleveland and batted .301. 
 
Overall, he appeared in 906 games through all or parts of 12 seasons, and batted .268. His 670 hits included 115 doubles, 19 triples and 27 home runs. He holds the record for most games played without ever stealing a base.

Cleveland initially dealt him to Boston on March 16 for catcher Sammy White and first baseman Jim Marshall. White chose to retire and the trade was cancelled but not before Nixon played five exhibition games for the Red Sox. Nixon returned to the Indians and started the regular season with them, appearing in 25 games, 21 as the starting catcher; then, almost three months after the original swap, on June 13, he was traded to the Red Sox a second time, with outfielder Carroll Hardy for Canadian-born pitcher Ted Bowsfield and outfielder Marty Keough.

Nixon remained with the Red Sox' organization through  as a platoon catcher, although he spent part of 1965 with Triple-A Toronto. Nixon spent two years as the Twins' second-string catcher, then was released in April 1968 and returned to the Red Sox' organization. Beginning the year at Double-A Pittsfield, he was recalled in July and in his first at bat, he hit a three-run, pinch-hit double, providing the winning margin in a 6–5 victory over the Twins.

But Nixon hit only .153 in his final Boston tour and was outrighted to their Triple-A Louisville affiliate. The Chicago White Sox then selected him in the Rule 5 draft that December.

Nixon reached base 863 times in his career without ever stealing a base, a Major League record.

National League coach and manager
His managing career began in the Cincinnati Reds' farm system in 1970 and in 1976 he was promoted to a coaching position with the defending World Series champion Reds, under Baseball Hall of Fame manager Sparky Anderson. In Nixon's first season, Cincinnati's "Big Red Machine" dynasty reached its pinnacle with a second consecutive world championship, dispatching the New York Yankees in a four-game sweep in the 1976 World Series. However, the Reds' period in the sun began to dim with the advent of baseball free agency. Anderson was fired after the 1978 season, and Nixon remained on the Reds' staff under their new manager, John McNamara, in 1979.

After compiling the best overall record in the National League West Division during the strike-affected split season of 1981, the Reds unraveled in 1982, plummeting into last place and losing 101 games. McNamara was fired July 21 and Nixon took his place.  Nixon was unable to right the ship, as the Reds went 27–43 the rest of way en route to what is still the only 100-loss season in franchise history. When the Reds finished last again in 1983, Nixon was fired. He then coached for the Montreal Expos (1984–85) before signing as a coach with the Braves. Nixon worked for Chuck Tanner in 1986–87 before his appointment as pilot of the Greenville Braves, the club's Double-A Southern League affiliate, for 1988.

While new general manager Bobby Cox had done much to rebuild the Braves' farm system, at the National League level Atlanta was in free fall. When the Braves dropped 27 of their first 39 games in 1988, Nixon was recalled from Greenville to succeed Tanner on May 23—a rare promotion of a manager from AA all the way to the majors.  However, the losses continued to pile up. The 1988 Braves finished 54–106, the worst season in the Atlanta portion of Braves history and the franchise's worst since its struggles in Boston during the Great Depression.  Nixon was unable turn the Braves' fortunes around in 1989 and 1990, seasons in which the Braves lost 97 games each, despite breaking in talented young pitchers such as Tom Glavine, John Smoltz and Steve Avery. On June 22, 1990, Cox fired Nixon.

Later career
At age 70, he spent the 2005 season as manager of the Greeneville Astros, rookie-level Appalachian League affiliate of the Houston Astros, and in 2006–07 he was a roving instructor in the Houston farm system. In 2008, Nixon, then 73, was still active in baseball as a roving instructor in the Texas Rangers' farm system, appointed by the club president at the time, Nolan Ryan.

Death
Russ Nixon died on November 8, 2016, in Las Vegas, Nevada, at the age of 81.

References

External links
, or Retrosheet
Russ Nixon at Baseball Almanac
Russ Nixon at Baseballbiography.com

1935 births
2016 deaths
Atlanta Braves coaches
Atlanta Braves managers
Baseball players from Ohio
Billings Mustangs managers
Boston Red Sox players
Cincinnati Bearcats baseball players
Cincinnati Reds coaches
Cincinnati Reds managers
Cleveland Indians players
Green Bay Bluejays players
Indianapolis Indians players
Jacksonville Beach Sea Birds players
Keokuk Kernels players
Las Vegas 51s managers
Major League Baseball bench coaches
Major League Baseball catchers
Major League Baseball first base coaches
Major League Baseball third base coaches
Minnesota Twins players
Montreal Expos coaches
People from Cleves, Ohio
Pittsfield Red Sox players
Portland Beavers managers
Seattle Mariners coaches
Toronto Maple Leafs (International League) players
Twin sportspeople
American expatriate baseball players in Cuba
Almendares (baseball) players
American expatriate baseball people in Canada